Baron Pietro Carlo Giovanni Battista Marochetti  (14 January 1805 – 29 December 1867) was an Italian-born French sculptor who worked in France, Italy and Britain. He completed many public sculptures, often in a neo-classical style, plus reliefs, memorials and large equestrian monuments in bronze and marble. In 1848, Marochetti settled in England, where he received commissions from Queen Victoria. Marochetti received great recognition during his lifetime, being made a baron in Italy and was awarded the Legion of Honour by the French government.

Biography

Early life
Carlo Marochetti was born in Turin, where his father, Vincenzo, a former priest, was a local government official and professor of eloquence at Turin University, but after the family moved to Paris, Carlo was brought up as a French citizen.  He studied at the Lycée Napoléon and then studied sculpture at the École des Beaux-Arts in Paris where his teachers were François Joseph Bosio and Antoine-Jean Gros. At the Paris Salon in 1827 he exhibited a marble statue of A Young Girl playing with a Dog which won a silver medal. Between 1822 and 1830 Marochetti frequently spent long periods in Rome where his mother was resident and where he collaborated with François-Joseph Duret and Antoine Étex and worked briefly at the studio of the Danish sculptor Bertel Thorvaldsen.

Career in France
From 1832 to 1848 Marochetti lived in Paris and largely adopted a neo-classical Romantic style of sculpture. He married Camille de Maussion in 1835 and together they had two sons and a daughter. In Paris, Marochetti received two significant commissions. One was for a relief panel of the Battle of Jemappes on the Arc de Triomphe and the other for a large marble statue group, the Elevation of Mary Magdalene for the altar of the Church of La Madeleine. He delayed completing the altar group to create a monumental equestrian statue of Emmanuel Philibert, Duke of Savoy which he donated to the city of Turin. The king of Sardinia, Charles Albert rewarded Marochetti for his gift by making him a baron of the kingdom of Italy. Before being sent to Italy the Philibert statue was displayed in the courtyard of the Louvre Palace during 1838. This effectively established Marochetti's reputation for creating equestrian monuments and led to him being commissioned to create such a statue of Ferdinand, Duke of Orleans, which stood in the courtyard of the Louvre for four years. In 1839 the French government awarded him the Legion of Honour. During 1840 Marochetti was competing to win both the commission for a monument to the Duke of Wellington for the city of Glasgow and for the commission to design the tomb of Napoleon for Les Invalides in Paris. Although he won the Glasgow commission, Marochetti's proposal for the tomb attracted wide-spread public criticism in France and was rejected.

When his father died, Marochetti inherited the family château at Vaux-sur-Seine outside of Paris and served as mayor of the town there from 1846. After the fall of the July Monarchy in 1848, and his subsequent failure to win a seat in the National Assembly, Marochetti followed the French king Louis-Philippe into exile in the United Kingdom.

Career in London
Marochetti spent the greater part of his time from 1848 until his death in London. He lived on Onslow Square, and maintained a large studio and his own foundry in the adjacent Sydney Mews. In his studio, Marochetti created an equestrian statue, in plaster, of Richard Coeur de Lion which was displayed at the Great Exhibition during 1851. A public campaign led to a bronze copy being made which was eventually, in 1860, erected in front of the Palace of Westminster on the orders of Prince Albert.

From his studio and foundry Marochetti, and his workforce, produced numerous statues, memorials and equestrian monuments plus smaller pieces. He also experimented with the use of new materials and the creation of multi-coloured, or polychromic, sculptures. Between 1853 and 1855 Marochetti created three life-size statues, plus busts and garden ornaments, for the Kingston Lacy country mansion in Dorset. His equestrian statues included those of Viscount Combermere in Chester and Sir Mark Cubbon in Bangalore and for Queen Victoria and Prince Albert in Glasgow. Works featuring mourning angels by Marochetti include the monument in St. Paul's Cathedral to Viscounts William and Frederick Melbourne, the Crimean War memorial at the Haydarpaşa Cemetery in Istanbul, dating from 1856–58, and his Angel of the Resurrection for the Cawnpore memorial in India from 1862-65. From 1864 Marochetti collaborated with Sir Edwin Landseer on the four bronze lions to be placed at the base of Nelson's Column in Trafalgar Square, and cast them at his Sydney Mews foundry. He experimented in using coloured marble following the work of John Gibson and a coloured statuette of Queen Victoria was exhibited at a London studio but is now lost. 

Not all of Marochetti's designs were so successful. His proposed design for the tomb of the Duke of Wellington was rejected. Marochetti's equestrian monument to George Washington for the 1855 New York Exhibition was destroyed by fire. In the 1860s he championed a scheme for a set of statues celebrating British engineers to be erected in the churchyard of St Margaret's, Westminster. The scheme was rejected but three of the statues, of Isambard Kingdom Brunel, Robert Stephenson and Joseph Locke were erected separately elsewhere. His monumental statue of Robert Peel in Parliament Square was melted down and the metal used for the smaller model of Peel by Matthew Noble which replaced it.

With the support of the exiled Louis-Philippe of France, Marochetti had first met Queen Victoria and Prince Albert in 1849 and subsequently received a number of royal commissions. Marochetti's first royal commission in England was for a marble portrait bust of Prince Albert in 1849, which was commercially reproduced in Parian ware by the Mintons company in 1862. That year Queen Victoria commissioned Marochetti to produce a portrait bust of herself as a birthday gift for Prince Albert and that too was reproduced by Mintons for the retail market. Rather than a crown, he depicted her wearing a head piece of various flowers, including roses and shamrocks, to represent the nations of the United Kingdom. 

Marochetti designed Victoria's memorial to Princess Elizabeth and a bust of Prince Albert at Newport Minster on the Isle of Wight. He also created the marble recumbent effigies for the tomb of Queen Victoria and Prince Albert in the Royal Mausoleum at Frogmore in Windsor Great Park. He was commissioned to make the seated figure of Albert for the Albert Memorial in Kensington Gardens. However the first version was rejected by the architect of the monument, Sir George Gilbert Scott, and Marochetti died before a satisfactory second version could be completed. He was elected an associate of the Royal Academy 1861 and a full academician in 1866.

Marochetti died, suddenly, at Passy in Paris and was buried at the Vaux-sur-Seine cemetery.

Selected public works

1830-1839

1840-1849

1850-1859

1860 and later

Other works
 Seated statue in marble of Sir Jamsetjee Jeejeebhoy, 1857, in the Asiatic Society Library, Mumbai Town Hall. Two versions in bronze of the same design, at the entrance to the JJ Institute and on Narriman Road, are also known.
 Memorial, in marble and black stone, to Sixteen Officers of the Engineers of 1857-58, c. 1862, in St. Paul's Cathedral, Kolkata. The memorial has a central inscription listing the names of British officers killed in the Indian Rebellion of 1857 with a surround containing their portraits in carved relief above a panel depicting the Siege of Lucknow.
 Bust of Queen Victoria, Haddo House, Scotland
 East Devonshire Regiment Crimean War memorial, Exeter Cathedral
 Memorial plaque, with portrait medallion, to Prince Albert, Sts Thomas Minster, Newport, Isle of Wight
 Monument to Princess Elizabeth, 1635-1650, Sts Thomas Minster, Newport, Isle of Wight, 1856
 Tomb of Lady Margaret Leveson Gower, Church of St Mary Magdalene, Castle Ashby, Northamptonshire, c. 1858
 Statue of St Michael, Parish Church of Champmotteux, Essonne
 Statue of General Henri Gatien Bertrand, 1773-1844, at Châteauroux, Indre, France

References

External links

 
 

1805 births
1867 deaths
19th-century French sculptors
19th-century Italian male artists
École des Beaux-Arts alumni
Artists from Paris
Artists from Turin
Chevaliers of the Légion d'honneur
Italian expatriates in France
Italian expatriates in the United Kingdom
Italian male sculptors
Lycée Henri-IV alumni
Pupils of Antoine-Jean Gros
Royal Academicians